All I Can Say is a 2019 documentary film about Blind Melon singer Shannon Hoon, consisting largely of footage he shot on his camcorder during the last five years of his life, from 1990 to 1995. The film, directed by Hoon (and directed after Hoon's death by Danny Clinch, Taryn Gould, and Colleen Hennessy), documents Hoon and his band's formation, their rapid rise to stardom, and his tragic death at the age of 28.

Overview
The film (whose title comes from the opening lyric of the song "No Rain") is set mostly in chronological order and filmed on Hoon's handheld video recorder, including the earliest footage of Blind Melon's formation in 1990 in Los Angeles, California, Hoon sitting in on Guns N' Roses' Use Your Illusion recording sessions, his relationship with his family and bandmates, the whirlwind success of the hit song "No Rain", and all the way up to (and including) the day he died on October 21, 1995, while on tour in support of Blind Melon's sophomore album, Soup.

Release
"All I Can Say" premiered at the Tribeca Film Festival on April 26, 2019, and was released on DVD and Blu-ray on November 24, 2020, which included an interview between Judd Apatow and the film's surviving directors, among other added features.

Reception

Critical response

For Variety, Andrew Barker wrote, "At one point, Hoon is asked how he keeps from getting lost in the whirlwind of stardom that has taken over his life, and he replies that this is the very reason he’s always walking around with a video camera: capturing enough of the mayhem so that he can try to make sense of it later on, when things finally calm down. He never got that opportunity, but full credit to the makers of All I Can Say for giving the rest of us a chance."

For Rolling Stone, David Fear gave the film a 4 out of 5 star rating, and wrote, "These are just home movies, you think. Then, this music doc strings them together and makes you feel like they aren’t just home movies at all. It turns them into a firsthand portrait of fame, making someone’s dreams come true and then majorly fucking with their head."

For Alternative Nation, Greg Prato wrote, "Thanks to Clinch, Gould, and Hennessy, we now have a fascinating glimpse into the tragically short life of one of the most captivating rock singers/performers of the era (and beyond) – Shannon Hoon."

For BraveWords, Aaron Small gave it an 8 rating out of 10, and wrote, "Impactful, intriguing, intimate, and honest, All I Can Say is an insider’s less than glamorous look at essentially immediate, and short-lived success."

Accolades

The film won the "Grand Jury Prize" at Sound Unseen, "Best Documentary Feature" at New Hampshire Film Festival, and "Best Feature Length Documentary" at the Rincon International Film Festival. The film was also selected as one of "The Best Movies of 2020" by Esquire.

The film was awarded as the "Best International Musical Documentary" at the 2020 In-Edit Festival.

References

External links 
 
 
 
 
 

2019 films
2019 documentary films
Rockumentaries
2010s English-language films